Mangkunegara VI (1 March 1857 – 1916) was the prince of Mangkunegaran from 1896 to 1916.

Biography

Early life 
Born in the Mangkunegaran Palace, Mangkunegara was born as R.M. Suyitno. He was the fourth son of Mangkunegara IV and Raden Ayu Dunuk. As an adult he took the name K.P.A. Dayaningrat. The  younger brother of the fifth Mangkunegara. When Mangkunegara V died after falling from a horse his throne was taken by his brother.

Reign 
Mangkunegara VI was coronated on 21 November 1896. He prioritized economic development. A crash came because the price of sugar fell due to emerging competition from Brazil. Mangkunegara VI adjusted and repaid much of the debt incurred under his predecessor. Mangkunegara VI enacted a number of cultural policies, obliging men to cut their long hair and made saluting unnecessary. He also brought tables and chairs into meetings that had previously been conducted sitting on the floor and allowed the people to embrace Christianity. He made the Mangkunegara Sultanate an independent power parallel to the Surakarta Sunanate. Mangkunegara became a new competitor in the fight over Kasunanan Javanese culture.

Economics 
Mangkunegara focused on traditional sectors of rural economy, modernizing coffee, indigo, sugar cane and sugar production in the Praja.

At one point Nederlandsch-Indische Spoorweg Maatschappij, a Dutch private railroad company was foreclosed for failure to pay taxes.

Policy 
The Praja policy was applied to allow the monarchy to act as both ruler and merchant. The policy was later adopted by Kasunanan Surakarta and Yogyakarta Sultanate. Traditional land holdings were overturned and turned over to plantations.

The Legiun Mangkunegaran was reorganized. Commander Major Mangkunegaran was given the rank of Colonel. Mangkunegara VI removed the position of Vice Commander for budget reasons.

Regional security 
During his reign bandits operating around Mangkunegaran increased their activities. Budget limitations kept the King from actively dealing with them. The Praja Police were responsible for security. The gangs looted and committed murder and rape.

Along the border with Surakarta, Mangkunegara VI had conflicts with Resident of Surakarta.

Java's expansion began in 1830 with the proliferation of plantations. The gangs were disappointed in the kingdom. Robber refers to those who forcibly plundered victims, while plaster refers to robbers who were relatively inactive.

In 1872 the region recorded 24 events conducted by robbers and plasters. On 15 November 1883 robbers killed a woman in the village of Kretek Jacks, Sragen.

Abdication 
Mangkunegara VI had two children; K.P.A. Suyono
Handayaningrat and B.R.Ay. Suwasti Hatmosurono. Mangkunegara VI wished to make his son the crown prince, he was vetoed by a group of relatives and the Dutch Colonial government. Mangkunegara VI eventually abdicated and settled in Surabaya.
 
Mangkunegara VI is the only king of Mangkunegaran who resigned of his own free will. In testimony Partini Mangkunegara VI said that on January 11, 1916 he quietly resigned and went with the whole family to Surabaya.

In Surabaya his son and daughter KPA Suyono Handayaningrat and RMP Hatmosurono were active in the movement of Budi Utomo and together with Dr. Sutomo founded the political party named Parindra.

When Mangkunegara VI died he was buried in Astana Utoro Nayu Surakarta. His nephew RMA Suryasuparta reigned next as Mangkunegara VII. Mangkunegara VI chose Surabaya as a place in the old days to prepare his son and daughter to continue the concept of state that can not be implemented through a Duchy.

Work achievement 
Mangkunegara VI's accomplishments included:
 Mangkunegara VI Praja reform that reduced the debt to Netherlands. Increased economic stability that improved living standards.
 Legion Mangkunegaran rebuilt strength.
 Pluralism that allowed relatives who later embraced Christianity to prosper under Mangkunegara VI.
 Reintroduced Java management principles in dealing with his father and Praja slump.
 Enforcement of financial Mangkunegara Mangkunegaran dynasty
 Created art with a puppet through without distortion story content.
 Opposed worship at the shrine that became venues for prostitution, which flourished at that time.

Heritage Mangkunegara VI 
In his reign, give relic Mangkunegara VI which until now frequently visited by the tourist is Sapta Tirta. Sumber water bath in this bath pablengan has seven kinds of natural resources which were located very close together, namely: Warm Water, Cold Water, Living Water, Water Off, Soda water, water Bleng, and water Mind your Mind.

Notes

References
 Gema Edisi Yubileum HIK Yogyakarta 60 tahun, Juli 1987, dalam:Media Komunikasi Keluarga Ex-HIK Yogyakarta, 1987.
 Damar Pustaka, Sufism in Javanese spiritual life; Literary Study based on Serat Wedhatama written by K.G.P.A.A. Mangkunegara IV.
 Haryanto, S.,Pratiwimba adhiluhung;Sejarah dan Perkembangan Wayang,Jakarta :Djambatan, 1988
 Soetomo(Raden),Paul W.Van der Veur,Kenang-kenangan Dokter Soetomo,Jakarta:Sinar Harapan, 1984.
 Samad, Bahrin, Suka duka pelajar Indonesia di Jepang sekitar Perang Pasifik, 1942–1945,Collection of accounts of Indonesian alumni from Japanese universities, 1942–1945.
 Ktut Sudiri Panyarikan,Dr. Saharjo, S.H., Departemen Pendidikan dan Kebudayaan, Direktorat Sejarah dan Nilai Tradisional, Proyek Inventarisasi dan Dokumentasi Sejarah Nasional, 1983.
 The Journal of Asian studies, Volume 47, Association for Asian Studies, 1988.
 Sutan takdir Alisyahbana, Achdiad Kartamiharja,Polemik kebudayaan: pergulatan pemikiran terbesar dalam sejarah kebangsaan, JAKARTA: PT Balai Pustaka, 2008.
 Wasino, Kapitalisme bumi putra: perubahan masyarakat Mangkunegaran, Yogyakarta:LKIS, 2008.
 Suara Merdeka, Semarang, 4 November 2009.
 Pranoto, W. Suhartono, Bandit-Bandit Pedesaan di Jawa, study historis 1850–1942, Yogyakarta: Graha Ilmu, 2010.
 Suryo Danisworo,Hendri Tanjung, Membuat Tempat Kerja Feel at Home: 7 Prinsip Suryo Management, Jakarta : GRASINDO, 2004.
 Denys Lombard, Nusa Jawa: Silang Budaya, Jakarta: Gramedia Pustaka Utama, 1996.
 Penguasa Sebagai Pengusaha, TEMPO, 16 Mei 1987.
 Dwipayana, Ari, AAG.,Bangsawan dan Kuasa;Kembalinya Para Ningrat di Dua Kota,Yogyakarta: IRE PRESS, 2004.
 Singgih,Pamoentjak,Roswitha,Partini: Tulisan Kehidupan Seorang Putri Mangkunegaran, berdasarkan cerita Partini,Jakarta:Djambatan, 1986.
 Sumarni,Sri,Nanik,Mangkunagaran WirengDance 1757—1987:A Historical Study www.j-armonia.com
 Heritage of Java; http://heritageofjava.com
 Suara Merdeka - Semarang: Rabu, 18 September 2002

Princes of Mangkunegaran
1857 births
1916 deaths
People from Surakarta